Christian Ashley Fauria (born September 22, 1971) is an American former football tight end.

Early life
Fauria attended Crespi Carmelite High School in Encino, California and lettered in football, track, and once in basketball.  In football, as a senior, he was the team captain, the team Most Valuable Player, a first-team All-Del Rey League honoree, and a first-team All-CIF honoree. In his only season of high school varsity basketball, he averaged 16.0 points and 13.0 rebounds.  Fauria graduated from high school in 1990.

Football career

College

Fauria attended the University of Colorado at Boulder, where he caught 98 passes for 1,458 yards (14.87 yards per rec.), and 12 touchdowns in a successful partnership with quarterback Kordell Stewart.  He still holds the Big Eight Conference record for pass receptions by a tight end.  As a senior, he was the team captain on an AP "top 3 team" that posted an 11-1 record, and was part of the offensive line that assisted Heisman Trophy winner Rashaan Salaam to a 2,000 yard season.  In that year, Fauria was also a first-team All-Big 8 choice, a third-team Associated Press All-American choice, and he won the Derek Singleton Award, which is given to the University of Colorado football player who displays the most enthusiasm, dedication, and spirit.  While in college, he appeared in an American version of Takeshi's Castle with other members of his family called "Storm the Castle" in 1993 and finished fifth. As stated in a broadcast of First Take, Fauria was involved in a fight during his senior year in college. He was attacked by a group of people and while defending himself, defeated the two attackers. However, this did not sit well with NFL teams who do not want their prospective draft picks "fighting." According to Fauria the situation cost him a First Round selection (Most Likely To Pittsburgh @ #27) and millions of dollars.

Professional football
Drafted with the 39th pick, Fauria played seven seasons with the Seattle Seahawks, recording a career-high 37 receptions in 1998. He then joined the New England Patriots in 2002 up until 2005, where he started and played for two Super Bowl championships (2004, 2005).  Some believed he was signed in 2002 to serve as a mentor to 1st round draft pick and fellow University of Colorado alumnus Daniel Graham, however Fauria earned the starting position during the season and recorded a career-high of seven touchdowns for the year.  After the Patriots, Fauria joined the Washington Redskins for one season.  He was released on February 28, 2007 and signed with the Carolina Panthers on September 10, 2007 to play in his 13th and final season.

On November 18, 2007, Fauria and Quarterback Vinny Testaverde hooked up for a two-yard touchdown reception that entered the pair into the NFL record books as having the oldest combined age for a touchdown reception (over 80 years).

NFL statistics

Post-NFL career
Fauria is a studio analyst for College Football on CBS Sports Network. Fauria previously served as a College Football analyst for ESPN.

Fauria is part of the WEEI-FM afternoon drive time show called Merloni & Fauria, with former Red Sox infielder Lou Merloni. In February 2018, he was suspended by the station for five days for using a stereotyped Asian accent to mock Chinese-American sports agent Don Yee, who represents former teammate Tom Brady. Partly due to fallout from the incident, WEEI-FM suspended its daytime live programming on February 16 so all employees could attend mandatory sensitivity training.

Personal life
Fauria resides in North Attleborough, Massachusetts.  He has five children. His son, Caleb Fauria, is a student and football player (Tight end) at his alumnus, University of Colorado, Boulder. His nephew, Joseph Fauria, played tight end for the Detroit Lions. His daughter, Camryn, is a top-scorer  and D1 player at Binghamton University.

References

1971 births
Living people
American football tight ends
Colorado Buffaloes football players
New England Patriots players
Seattle Seahawks players
Washington Redskins players
Carolina Panthers players
People from Harbor City, Los Angeles